The Labour Front won the most seats in the 1955 Singaporean general election. The leader of the Labour Front, David Saul Marshall negotiated with other parties to form a coalition government.

After spent three days of discussion, a minority coalition government of LF-UMNO-MCA was formed.

List of Ministers

The names in bold are the surnames of Chinese persons, and the personal names of Indian and Malay persons

References

 

Executive branch of the government of Singapore
Lists of political office-holders in Singapore
Cabinets established in 1955
Cabinets disestablished in 1956